Duke of Lafões (in Portuguese, Duque de Lafões) is a Portuguese title of nobility created under the decree of February 17, 1718, of King John V of Portugal and granted to his nephew, Dom Pedro Henrique de Bragança, the building force behind Palacio do Grilo and first son of Infante Miguel de Bragança, the latter an illegitimate son of King Peter II of Portugal and Anne Armande Pastre de Verger. Pedro's mother, Luisa Casimira de Sousa Nassau e Ligne was the first to use this title. The title was later passed on to his brother, João Carlos de Bragança e Ligne de Sousa Tavares Mascarenhas da Silva, the most famous Duke of this title.

List of the dukes of Lafões

Luísa Casimira de Sousa Nassau e Ligne, Duchess of Lafões (1694–1729), married to Infante Miguel of Braganza (natural son of Peter II, King of Portugal), was the first to use this title. However, she is not included in the list of Dukes, once King John V's decree granted the title to Luísa's older son:

D. Luísa Antónia Inês Casimira de Sousa Nassau e Ligne (1694-1729)
D. Pedro de Bragança e Ligne Sousa Tavares Mascarenhas da Silva (1718-1761)
D. João Carlos de Bragança e Ligne Sousa Tavares Mascarenhas da Silva (1719-1806)
D. Ana de Bragança e Ligne Sousa Tavares Mascarenhas da Silva (1797-1851)
D. Maria Carlota de Bragança e Ligne Sousa Tavares Mascarenhas da Silva (1820-1865)
D. Caetano de Bragança e Ligne Sousa Tavares Mascarenhas da Silva (1856-1927)
D. Afonso de Bragança (1893-1946)
D. Lopo de Bragança (1921-2008)
D. Afonso Caetano de Barros e Carvalhosa de Bragança (1956-2021)
D. Miguel Bernardo de Casal Ribeiro Bravo de Bragança (?- )

Genealogical summary
The House of Lafões descends from the marriage between Infante Miguel of Braganza (King Peter II's natural son) and Luísa-Casimira, 30th representative of the House of Sousa and 6th Countess of Miranda do Corvo.

See also
Dukes of Miranda do Corvo
Marquis of Arronches
Count of Miranda do Corvo
List of Portuguese Dukedoms

External links
 Genealogy of the Dukes of Lafões, in Portuguese

Bibliography
”Nobreza de Portugal e do Brasil" – Vol. III, pages 665/669. Published by Zairol Lda., Lisbon 1989.
"D.João Carlos de Bragança, 2º Duque de Lafões - Uma Vida Singular no Século das Luzes" - Nuno Gonçalo Monteiro and Fernando Dores Costa. Edições Inapa. 2006

 
Lafoes
Lafoes
Portuguese noble families
1718 establishments in Portugal